Nationality words link to articles with information on the nation's poetry or literature (for instance, Irish or France).

Events

Works published

Great Britain
 Anonymous, Sir Lamwell, publication year uncertain but thought to be sometime from 1530 to this year; a version of an Authurian "fairy mistress" tale from Marie de France's Lai de Lanval, written in the second half of the 12th century
 Geoffrey Chaucer, edited by William Thynne (see also  1561,  1598); Great Britain
 William Walter, Guistarde and Sigismonde, translation of Boccaccio's Decameron, Day 4, Tale 1, translated from a Latin version by Leonardo Bruni and edited by Robert Copland); Great Britain

Other
 Ludovico Ariosto, Orlando Furioso, first definitive version published; Italy
 Clément Marot, L’Adolescence clémentine, including many poems in formes fixes (ballades and rondeaux) as well as the long allegorical poem Le Temple de Cupidon; the author's first published collection; France
 Yamazaki Sōkan, editor, Shinseninutsukubashū, significant anthology of early Japanese haikai renga from which haiku later developed
 François Villon, Oeuvres ("Works"), first edition with commentary on the works by Clément Marot; France

Births
Death years link to the corresponding "[year] in poetry" article:
 February 19 – Jean-Antoine de Baïf (died 1589), French poet and member of La Pléiade
 Lelio Bonzi (death year not known), Italian, Latin-language poet
 Étienne Jodelle (died 1573) French poet and playwright
 Dominicus Lampsonius (died 1599), Flemish  humanist, poet, and artist
 Georg List (died 1596), German
 Thomas Norton (died 1584), politician and poet
 Bartholomäus Ringwaldt year of death uncertain (died 1599), German
 Gosvāmī Tulsīdās तुलसीदास, also known as "Tulasī Dāsa" and "Tulsidas" (died 1623) Awadhi poet and philosopher

Deaths
Birth years link to the corresponding "[year] in poetry" article:
 Juan del Encina died late this year or early 1533 (born 1468), Spanish poet, musician and playwright
 Andrzej Krzycki (born 1482), Polish archbishop, Latin prose writer and Polish-language poet often considered one of Poland's greatest humanist writers

See also

 Poetry
 16th century in poetry
 16th century in literature
 French Renaissance literature
 Renaissance literature
 Spanish Renaissance literature

Notes

16th-century poetry
Poetry